OTRK may refer to:

Old Turkic language
Operatyvno-taktychnyi raketnyi kompleks (Ukrainian), and operativno-taktichesky raketny kompleks (Russian) for "operational-tactical missile complex", which for example may refer to:
Hrim-2 Ukrainian tactical ballistic missile, also called the OTRK Sapsan
9K720 Iskander, a Russian missile system
OTRK Oka, a Soviet-era missile system
National Television and Radio Broadcasting Corporation (NTRK) of Kyrgyzstan, formerly Public Broadcasting Corporation (OTRK)